Route 120 is a state highway in Connecticut, running entirely in the town of Southington. It serves as a more direct connection between the town center of Southington and the city of Meriden.

Route description
It heads in a northwest direction, crossing Misery Brook about  later, passing by the St. Thomas Cemetery, then intersecting with Route 364 after another . Route 120 ends at an intersection with Route 10 in the center of town after another . The entire length of Route 120 is two lanes wide and is known as Meriden Avenue. Route 120 is classified as an urban major collector road and carries an average daily traffic volume of 8,900.

History
In the 1920s, the direct Southington-Meriden route was designated as a secondary state highway known as Highway 326. The old highway was renumbered to Route 120 as part of the 1932 state highway renumbering. The route has remained mostly unchanged since then.

Junction list

References

External links

120
Transportation in Hartford County, Connecticut
Southington, Connecticut